Lady of the Night may refer to:

 A woman who engages in prostitution

Plant
 Brassavola nodosa, a Mexican orchid
 Cestrum nocturnum, a West Indian plant species
 Lady of the Night cactus

Films
 Lady of the Night (1925 film), an American drama directed by Monta Bell
 Lady of the Pavements, a 1929 film released in the UK as Lady of the Night
 Lady of the Night (1986 film), an Italian film

Music
 Lady of the Night (album), an album by Donna Summer, or the title track
 "Lady of the Night", a song by Bucks Fizz from Bucks Fizz
 "The Lady of the Night", a 1973 song by David Houston
 "Lady of the Night", a song by LGT, featured in the Hungarian film A kenguru ("The Kangaroo") (1975)

Other uses
 Lady of the Night, a title for Santa Muerte, a cult image, female deity, and folk saint in folk Catholicism and Mexican Neopaganism

See also
 Night Lady, a 1964 album by John Griffin